The McShane Bell Foundry, located in St. Louis, Missouri, is a maker of church bells founded in 1856. Over the past 150 years, the firm has produced over 300,000 bells.  In 2019, the company moved its headquarters from Glen Burnie, near Baltimore, Maryland to St. Louis Missouri, as it centralized its manufacturing and shipping.

History
Henry McShane (1830-1889), an immigrant from Dundalk, Ireland, established the McShane Bell Foundry in Baltimore, Maryland at Holliday and Centre Streets in 1856. By the late 19th century, the business had produced tens of thousands of bells, including dozens of chimes, shipping them out to churches and public buildings across the USA and beyond, and expanded to a large factory complex on Guilford Avenue (then known as North Street). In 1935, the Henry McShane Manufacturing Company sold the foundry to William Parker, whose family continued to operate the business for three generations. The McShane Bell Foundry moved to Glen Burnie, Maryland in 1979 and was the only surviving large Western-style bell maker of the many that had once operated in the United States. Over the course of more than a century, the firm produced over 300,000 bells for cathedrals, churches, municipal buildings and schools in communities around the world - including the 7,000-pound bell that hangs in the dome of Baltimore City Hall. It was featured on an episode of the Discovery Channel's show Dirty Jobs. In 2019, ownership of the company changed, and it was relocated to Saint Louis, Missouri, where it is now known as the McShane Bell Company.

References

External links

McShane Bell Company website
Index of chimes made by the McShane Bell Foundry
The McShane bell foundry (1900), company catalog

Bell foundries of the United States
Manufacturing companies based in St. Louis
Companies based in Anne Arundel County, Maryland
Glen Burnie, Maryland
1856 establishments in Maryland